Rajinder Manchanda Bani (1932-1981) was an Indian poet. He was born at Multan in 1932. His family migrated to Delhi in 1947 where he died in 1981. He was a Master of Arts in Economics from Punjab University, and a school- teacher. Harf e Moetbar (1972), Hisab e Rang (1976) & Shafaq e Shajjar are his three collections of poems. He was a poet of neo-classical ghazal who did not use conventional imagery and was original in style; he was an effective user of Hindi diction. He was a physically weak person who did not maintain good health throughout his life-time but possessed a sturdy mind; he lived for 49 years.

References

1932 births
1981 deaths
People from Multan
Punjabi people
Urdu-language poets from India
Indian male poets
Hindu poets
20th-century Indian poets
Poets from Delhi
20th-century Indian male writers